The Great Wen is a disparaging nickname for London.  The term was coined in the 1820s by William Cobbett, the radical pamphleteer and champion of rural England.  Cobbett saw the rapidly growing city as a pathological swelling on the face of the nation. (A "wen" is a sebaceous cyst.) The term is quoted in his 1830 work Rural Rides:  "But, what is to be the fate of the great wen of all? The monster, called, by the silly coxcombs of the press, 'the metropolis of the empire?'"

See also
List of city nicknames in the United Kingdom
List of disparaging nicknames for settlements

References

City nicknames
Social history of London
19th century in London